James Meade (1907–1995) was a British economist.

Jimmy, Jim or James Meade may also refer to:

James Meade (before 1570–after 1596), English landowner; built Narborough Hall
James M. Meade (before 1790–1812), American captain; namesake of Meade County, Kentucky
James Meade, President of Dominica from 1882 to 1887 (List of colonial governors and administrators of Dominica#Presidents (1872–1895))
Jim Meade (1914–1977), American football player
James Meade, Montserrat politician in West Indies federal elections, 1958#Senate Selection
Jim Meade, American hijacker, D. B. Cooper's alias in 1981's The Pursuit of D. B. Cooper
Jim Meade, Irish chief executive of Iarnród Éireann
Jimmy Meade, American plaintiff in Obergefell v. Hodges#Bourke v. Beshear

See also
James Mead (disambiguation)
Meade (surname)